Perri Pierre (born December 28, 1988) is an American filmmaker and actor of Haitian descent.

Biography 
Pierre was born in Brooklyn, New York City and grew up in Les Cayes, Haiti. After studying drama and theatre at Queens College, he decided to focus solely on film.

In 2011, he wrote, directed, and starred in his first production, J-12, which aired on national television in 2013. He produced and starred in his second production, Three of One Kind, with which he won his first award, a People's Choice Award from the International Movie Trailer Festival.

In February 2013, Pierre starred in and produced Addiction, which was released in select theaters in New York and Los Angeles that summer. The DVD came out on Amazon.com on February 11, 2014.

Filmography 

Acting credits

Awards 
 2012 International Movie Trailer Festival – People's Choice Award – J-12
 2014 Nollywood and African People's Choice Awards – Favorite Short Film – J-12
 2016 Black Reel Awards – Exceptional Independent Short Film – Addiction

External links 
Official website

References 

1988 births
Living people
21st-century American male actors
Male actors from New York City
American male film actors
Male actors of Haitian descent
People from Brooklyn
Haitian-American male actors